Maximiliano Meza may refer to:

 Maximiliano Meza (footballer, born 1992), Argentine international midfielder
 Maximiliano Meza (footballer, born 1997), Argentine midfielder